Lake Shore or Lakeshore may refer to:

 the shore of a lake

Places
 Lakeshore, Ontario, Canada
Lakeshore (provincial electoral district)
 Lakeshore, California (disambiguation), the name of several places in the U.S.
 Lakeshore, Florida, U.S.
 Lake Shore, Jacksonville, Florida, U.S.
 Lakeshore, Louisiana, U.S.
 Lake Shore, Maryland, U.S.
 Lake Shore, Minnesota, U.S.
 Lakeshore, Mississippi, U.S.
 Lakeshore/Lake Vista, New Orleans, U.S.
 Lake Shore, Utah, U.S.
 Lake Shore, Washington, U.S.
 Lake Shore Drive, an expressway in Chicago, Illinois, U.S.
 Lake Shore Boulevard, a road in Toronto, Ontario, U.S.
 Lake Shore Mine, a gold mine in Kirkland Lake, Ontario, Canada

Businesses and organisations
 Lakeshore Entertainment, an American film company
 Lakeshore Records
 Lakeshore High School, in Mandeville, Louisiana
 Lake Shore High School, in St. Clair Shores, Michigan
 Lake Shore High School (Angola, New York)
 Lakeshore Hospital, in Kochi, Kerala, India

Other uses
 Lake Shore, a long-distance passenger train between Chicago and New York
 Lakeshore, Bristol, a building in England
 Lakeshore SC, a Canadian soccer club

See also

 Lake Shore Drive (disambiguation)
 Lake Shore Railway (disambiguation)
 List of national lakeshores and seashores of the United States